The Orthodox Church of the Gauls (OCG; , EOG) is a self-governing Christian church formed in 2006. 

The  is part of the Communion of Western Orthodox Churches.

Beliefs
The  professes the doctrinal teachings of the ecumenical councils of Nicea, Constantinople, and Ephesus.

History

Eastern Orthodoxy

When the deception was subsequently realised after an eventual investigation in September of the same year, an envoy was sent to Kovalevsky to apologise for the hasty judgement. However, it was too late.

Oriental Orthodoxy

After a period of negotiation, a group of the Orthodox Church of the Gauls was welcomed into the fold of the French Coptic Orthodox Church (FCOC) in 2000. The group comprised the following communities, as well as a number of other disparate clergy:
The monastic community of Saint Michel and Saint Martin, which follows the Rule of Saint Benedict.
The Bethany Community – a lay community for hesychastic spirituality, led at the time by Father Alphonse and Rachel Goettmann at Gorze.

However, some years later, in 2005, Abba Marcos issued a letter insisting that the clergy must adopt the Coptic rite and, moreover, making the claim that the use of the western liturgies had never been authorised by him. Having been afforded no opportunity to appeal against this decision, the affected clergy petitioned Pope Shenouda III of Alexandria in February 2006 for an audience to discuss the matter further. When they had not received a response by June of the same year, it became clear that remaining with the  would mean abandoning their Western Orthodox liturgical and spiritual heritage.

Communion of Western Orthodox Churches 

In 2007, the Orthodox Church of the Gauls, the French Orthodox Church, and the Celtic Orthodox Church established the Communion of Western Orthodox Churches.

In the years of stability since then, through organic expansion and the founding of new communities, the  has grown numerically and today comprises a number of parishes, missions, and monastic houses in France, Belgium, Spain, Poland, the United States of America, Brazil, and the United Kingdom.

Relations with other churches

Notes

References

External links
   
Manifesto of the Orthodox Church of the Gauls
A directory of communities and clergy of the OCG.
Communion des Églises orthodoxes occidentales 

Western Rite Orthodoxy
Christian organizations established in 2006
Christian organizations established in the 21st century